SuperBrawl VIII was the eighth SuperBrawl professional wrestling pay-per-view (PPV) event produced by World Championship Wrestling (WCW). The event took place on February 22, 1998 from the Cow Palace in Daly City, California (though WCW billed it as San Francisco).

Storylines
The event featured wrestlers from pre-existing scripted feuds and storylines. Wrestlers portrayed villains, heroes, or less distinguishable characters in the scripted events that built tension and culminated in a wrestling match or series of matches.

The major storyline entering SuperBrawl was the ongoing dispute over the WCW World Heavyweight Championship. At Starrcade in December 1997, Hollywood Hogan and Sting squared off in the main event for the title, which at the time belonged to Hogan. Hogan initially was awarded the victory but the decision was reversed by Bret Hart, who claimed referee Nick Patrick had made a fast count and restarted the match, which Sting won by submission. Due to the circumstances surrounding the match, a rematch was ordered for the December 29, 1997 edition of WCW Monday Nitro. After that match, officially a no contest, again ended with controversy surrounding its conclusion, WCW Executive Committee Chairman J. J. Dillon announced on the premiere episode of WCW Thunder on January 8, 1998 that the title was being held up pending a solution. The solution was announced at Souled Out on January 24, with the announcement of another match between Sting and Hogan for the vacated championship.

Event

The match between Brad Armstrong and Bill Goldberg was added last-minute. Originally, Larry Zbyszko was to face Louie Spicolli in a match, but Spicolli died of a drug overdose seven days before the event.

Rick Martel was originally booked to win the match against Booker T. However, he suffered a torn knee ligament after hitting his leg on the ropes after a hip toss from Booker T. The winner of the match was to immediately defend the title against Saturn. Due to Martel's injury and the reworking of the finish, Saturn and Booker were forced to improvise the entire match.

Steve McMichael suffered a broken arm during the course of his match against The British Bulldog.

Lex Luger forced Randy Savage to submit with the Torture Rack. Elizabeth interfered while Luger first put Savage in the Torture Rack and pulled him down. Immediately after that, Scott Norton, Buff Bagwell, Brian Adams, and Vincent rushed the ring and began attacking Luger. Hollywood Hogan then came out and called all four members of the nWo back to the locker room, thus leaving Savage alone in the ring.

Scott Hall pinned Rick Steiner after an Outsider's Edge. Scott Steiner turned on Rick midway through the match and refused to help him fight off The Outsiders. After the match Scott handed the tag team title belts to the Outsiders and joined the New World Order.

In the main event Sting pinned Hollywood Hogan after a Scorpion Deathdrop. While Sting hit the move, Hogan kicked referee Nick Patrick and knocked him down. While the referee was down, Scott Norton, Buff Bagwell, Brian Adams, Vincent, Konnan, and Randy Savage came to the ring. Everyone except Savage went to attack Sting. As Hogan was trying to get up, Savage struck him with a spraycan and left the ring. Sting scored the pin and won the match.

Reception
In 2012, Jack Bramma of 411Mania gave the event a rating of 7.0 [Good], stating, "Really solid PPV until the prime time players show up in the last hour to bathe in the tears of small children with two swerves, several run-ins, and no clean finishes in the final three marquee matches. Watch the first 2/3 for workrate and the final 1/3 for personality."

Results

References

External links
SuperBrawl VIII

SuperBrawl 8
Professional wrestling in San Francisco
1998 in San Francisco
Events in San Francisco
February 1998 events in the United States
1998 World Championship Wrestling pay-per-view events